Hemicycla inutilis is a species of gastropod in the Helicidae family. It is endemic to the Canary Islands.

References

Endemic fauna of the Canary Islands
Helicidae
Endemic fauna of Spain
Gastropods described in 1872
Taxonomy articles created by Polbot